Aleksandr Alekseyevich Petrovskiy (also Alexander Petrovskiy, ; born 3 March 1989 in Tashkent, Uzbek SSR) is a Russian professional track cyclist. He shared gold medals with Evgeny Kovalev in men's madison at the 2007 UCI Track Cycling Junior World Championships in Aguascalientes, Mexico, and later represented his nation Russia at the 2008 Summer Olympics. During his sporting career, Petrovskiy also raced for the under-23 division of  Pro Cycling.

Petrovskiy qualified for the Russian squad in the men's team pursuit at the 2008 Summer Olympics in Beijing based on the nation's selection process from the UCI Track World Rankings. He delivered the Russian foursome of Alexei Markov, Alexander Serov, and Nikolay Trusov an eighth-place time of 4:06.518 in the prelims before his team was later relegated and overlapped to the Brits (led by Olympic time trial champion Bradley Wiggins) in the fourth match round.

Career highlights

2007
  UCI Juniors Track World Championships (Madison), Aguascalientes (MEX)
  UCI Juniors Track World Championships (Team pursuit with Evgeny Kovalev), Aguascalientes (MEX)
 2nd UCI European Junior Track Championships (Madison), Cottbus (GER)
 3rd UCI European Junior Track Championships (Team pursuit), Cottbus (GER)
2008
 2nd UCI European U23 Track Championships (Team pursuit), Pruszków (POL)
 8th Olympic Games (Team pursuit with Alexei Markov, Alexander Serov, and Nikolay Trusov), Beijing (CHN)
2009
 3rd Stage 1, Grand Prix du Portugal, Paredes (POR)
 3rd Stage 3, Udmurt Republic Stage Race, Udmurtia (RUS)

References

External links
NBC 2008 Olympics profile

1989 births
Living people
Russian male cyclists
Russian track cyclists
Cyclists at the 2008 Summer Olympics
Olympic cyclists of Russia
Sportspeople from Tashkent
21st-century Russian people